Dame Sarah MacIntosh  (born 7 August 1969) is a British diplomat who is the Deputy National Security Adviser for International Affairs. She previously served as High Commissioner to Sierra Leone, Ambassador to Liberia and British Ambassador to NATO from 2017 to 2022.

Biography
MacIntosh joined the Foreign and Commonwealth Office (FCO) in 1991 and served at the UK missions to the UN in New York and Vienna, and in the British embassy in Madrid. She was strategy coordinator for the UN mission in Kosovo 2004–05, and High Commissioner to Sierra Leone (and non-resident Ambassador to Liberia) 2006–08. She then took a fellowship at the Weatherhead Center for International Affairs at Harvard University 2008–09. She was Director, Strategic Finance at the FCO 2009–11, Director, Defence and International Security 2011–14, and Director General, Defence and Intelligence 2014–16. In November 2016 the FCO announced that she had been appointed Permanent Representative to the United Kingdom's Delegation to NATO. She took up the post in February 2017.

Already Companion of the Order of St Michael and St George (CMG), she was appointed Dame Commander of the Order of St Michael and St George (DCMG) in the 2020 Birthday Honours for services to British foreign policy.

References

External links
 Profile at Gov.uk website

1969 births
Living people
British women ambassadors
Dames Commander of the Order of St Michael and St George
High Commissioners of the United Kingdom to Sierra Leone
Ambassadors of the United Kingdom to Liberia
Permanent Representatives of the United Kingdom to NATO